Ana Dabović (Serbian Cyrillic: Ана Дабовић; born August 18, 1989) is a Serbian professional basketball player for the BLMA of the French Ligue 1 and EuroLeague Women. She also represents the Serbian national basketball team.

Since 17 April 2015 to October 2016, she was a president of ŽKK Vojvodina.

Club career
Dabović began her professional career in WBC Herceg Novi, playing there from 2005 until 2007. She then signed with the Albanian team Flamurtari Vlore for the 2007–08 season, only to return a year later to Herceg Novi. In the following years she played for several foreign teams, including Greek WBC Aris, Russian WBC Dynamo Novosibirsk, Polish Wisła Kraków and Turkish TED Ankara Kolejliler.

In April 2013, she signed with Dynamo Moscow in the Russian Women's Basketball Premier League. She later played for Ormanspor in the Turkish Women's Basketball League. Dabović would play for Yakın Doğu Üniversitesi in 2015 of the Turkish Women's Basketball League. In 2016, Dabović once again played for Dynamo Moscow. In 2017, Dabović signed with Fenerbahçe.

WNBA career
Dabović entered the 2009 WNBA Draft but went undrafted. She would play the next 6 years overseas before being signed to a WNBA team. On February 18, 2015, Dabović signed a contract with the Los Angeles Sparks of the WNBA. On July 8, 2015, she made the WNBA debut for the Sparks, scoring 2 points in 8 minutes of action against the San Antonio Stars. Despite some limited minutes in the beginning of her stint with the Sparks, her role in the team increased over the time. Over 24 regular-season games, she averaged 8.8 points, 1.9 assists and 1.6 rebounds on 44.6% shooting from the field. For such performances, she was selected into the 2015 WNBA All-Rookie Team. In 2016, Dabović won her first WNBA championship with the Sparks as they defeated the Minnesota Lynx 3–2 in the finals.

On February 1, 2018, Dabović signed a contract to return to the Los Angeles Sparks for the 2018 WNBA season.

International career
She represented Serbian national basketball team at the EuroBasket 2015 in Budapest where they won the gold medal, and qualified for the 2016 Olympics, first in the history for the Serbian team.
On August 20, 2016, the Serbian team played for bronzed medal against France and won 70:63. This is the first medal Serbian women basketball team won in the Olympics.

Personal life

Family
Her father is basketball coach Milan Dabović and her mother is Nevenka Dabović, former handball player. Ana has an older brother Milan, who is an active basketball player, and two older sisters, Jelica, a former basketball player, and Milica, a former basketball player.

Relationships
Since 2013, she was in a relationship with the former mayor of Belgrade and president of Basketball Federation of Serbia, Dragan Đilas. The couple separated at the end of 2014.

WNBA statistics

Regular season

|- 
| style="text-align:left;"| 2015
| style="text-align:left;"| Los Angeles
| 24 || 8 || 22.1 ||.446 ||.333|| .808|| 1.6|| 1.9 || .8 || .0 || 1.5 || 8.8
|-
|style="text-align:left;background:#afe6ba;"|  2016†
| style="text-align:left;"| Los Angeles
| 22 || 0 ||10.7|| .370 || .158 ||.759|| .8 || 1.3 || .5 || .0 || .8 || 3.0
|-
| style="text-align:left;"| Career
| style="text-align:left;"|2 years, 1 team
|46||8||16.7||.427||.291||.790||1.2||1.6||.7||.0||1.2||6.0

Playoffs

|- 
| style="text-align:left;"| 2015
| style="text-align:left;"| Los Angeles
| 3||0||19.6||.500||.714||.714||1.7||3.7||.3||.0||.3||11.7
|- 
|style="text-align:left;background:#afe6ba;"| 2016†
| style="text-align:left;"| Los Angeles
| 6||0||8.0||.071||.143||1.000||.3||2.0||.1||.0||.6||0.8
|-
| style="text-align:left;"| Career
| style="text-align:left;"|2 years, 1 team
| 9||0||11.9||.324||.429||.750||0.8||2.6||.2||.0||.6||4.4

See also 
 List of Serbian WNBA players

References

External links

Profile at eurobasket.com
Profile at fiba.com
Profile at wnba.com

1989 births
Living people
Basketball players at the 2016 Summer Olympics
Competitors at the 2009 Mediterranean Games
European champions for Serbia
Fenerbahçe women's basketball players
Los Angeles Sparks players
Medalists at the 2016 Summer Olympics
Mediterranean Games silver medalists for Serbia
Olympic basketball players of Serbia
Olympic bronze medalists for Serbia
Olympic medalists in basketball
Serbian expatriate basketball people in the United States
Serbian expatriate basketball people in Greece
Serbian expatriate basketball people in Italy
Serbian expatriate basketball people in Russia
Serbian expatriate basketball people in Turkey
Serbian basketball executives and administrators
Serbian women's basketball players
Serbs of Montenegro
Shooting guards
Sportspeople from Cetinje
Women's National Basketball Association players from Serbia
Mediterranean Games medalists in basketball
Basketball players at the 2020 Summer Olympics
Undrafted Women's National Basketball Association players